Jan De Cock may refer to:

 Jan De Cock (b. 1976), Belgian artist 
 Jan Claudius de Cock (1667–1736), Flemish artist
 Jan Wellens de Cock (c. 1480–1527), Flemish painter and draftsman